Giulio Ulisse Arata (21 August 1881 – 15 September 1962) was an Italian architect. His work was part of the architecture event in the art competition at the 1936 Summer Olympics.

References

1881 births
1962 deaths
20th-century Italian architects
Olympic competitors in art competitions
People from Piacenza